Rooms: The Main Building is a puzzle game by South Korean studio HandMade Game, initially released in 2008 for Windows. The game was released for the Nintendo DS and Wii by Hudson Entertainment on March 23, 2010.

Gameplay
The player moves rooms of a building around to help the game's protagonist reach the exit.

Development
The game was initially developed by independent game studio HandMade Game before being released by Big Fish Games in 2008 and again in 2010 by Hudson Entertainment.

Reception
Wiiloveit.com gave the game a 25/30, describing it as "truly innovative" for the way it "takes a familiar concept and develops it into a full-fledged game". It received an aggregated score of 60 percent from eight reviews at Metacritic.

References

2008 video games
IOS games
Hudson Soft games
Nintendo DS games
Puzzle video games
Video games developed in South Korea
Wii games
Windows games
MacOS games
BAFTA winners (video games)
Big Fish Games games